Huddersfield Town's 1969–70 campaign saw Town crowned as champions of Division 2. They outclassed the rest of the division and finished 7 points clear of 2nd placed Blackpool. Town's team were largely unchanged for most of the season, with 7 members of the team (Dennis Clarke, Roy Ellam, Geoff Hutt, Jimmy McGill, Jimmy Nicholson, Terry Poole and Frank Worthington) played every league match that season. They gained promotion to the 1st Division for the first time since the 1955-56 season.

Squad at the start of the season

Review
Following a successful end to the previous season, many were hoping that Town could possibly mount a serious promotion challenge to Division 1. A good start to the season followed with 3 wins from the first 3 games against Oxford United, Aston Villa and Preston North End. A loss at Leeds Road against Blackburn Rovers would be Town's only home defeat of the season, but following another loss against Queens Park Rangers saw Town stumble slightly, but they then went on a run of 1 loss in 13 matches, which saw Town climb to the summit of the table in November, but an indifferent spell in December saw Town slip to third by the end of the yeay, which then saw Town only lose one more league match during the season.

Amongst the impressive statistics from the season, Town used only 15 players during the league season and 7 of them (Clarke, Ellam, Hutt, McGill, Nicholson, Poole and Worthington) played every match. Town clinched promotion with a 1-1 draw at Middlesbrough, which was followed up by a 2-0 win at Blackburn Rovers, which clinched the title, the first trophy they had won since winning the Division 1 title for the third time, back in 1926. They finished the season 60 points, 7 clear of 2nd placed Blackpool.

Squad at the end of the season

Results

Division Two

FA Cup

Football League Cup

Appearances and goals

Huddersfield Town A.F.C. seasons
Huddersfield Town